Vincent Kaufmann (born 1969 in Geneva) is a Swiss sociologist specialized in mobility studies and urban sociology. He is a professor of sociology at EPFL (École Polytechnique Fédérale de Lausanne) and the head of the Laboratory of Urban Sociology at the School of Architecture, Civil and Environmental Engineering.

Career 
Kaufman studied sociology at the University of Geneva and received his Licence (Master's degree) in 1992. He joined Michel Bassand at EPFL as a doctoral student to work on urban sociology, in particular on rationalities underlying transport modal practices. He graduated with thesis on "Sociologie de la mobilité urbaine : la question du report modal" in 1998. He continued as a postdoctoral fellow at EPFL's Research Institute of the Built Environment (IREC). He then moved to Lancaster University as an invited lecturer in 2000. In 2001, he became an invited scholar at the Ecole Nationale des Ponts et Chaussées in the Laboratoire Techniques, Territoires et Société and continued to investigate perception and modal choice. In 2002, he was made associate professor at the Cergy-Pontoise University. 

In 2003, he first became assistant professor at EPFL and was promoted to an associate professor position in 2010. Since 2003 he has been the head of the Laboratory of Urban Sociology at EPFL's School of Architecture, Civil and Environmental Engineering.

Since 2011 he is scientific director of the Forum Vies Mobiles in Paris. In 2020, he became associate dean for Education and Knowledge Transfer at  EPFL's School of Architecture, Civil and Environmental Engineering. As invited lecturer he taught among others at Université du Québec (2008) Radboud University Nijmegen (2010), University of Toulouse-Jean Jaurès (2011), Polytechnic University of Milan (2016), Université catholique de Louvain (2004-2018), and Tongji University in Shanghai (2018).

Research 
Kaufmann's research focuses on motility, the relation of mobility and urban life styles, the links between social and spatial mobility, public policies of land planning and use, and transportation in general. In an interdisciplinary manner he draws both on engineering, architecture and sociology to study the social conditions that produce  and shape cities or territories, mainly through the mobility capacities of its actors. His research topics are among others daily mobility, residential history, the dynamics of sub-urbanization and gentrification, public spaces, and network management.

Selected works

Journal papers

Books

References

External links 
 
 Website of the Laboratory of Urban Sociology

1969 births
Living people
University of Geneva alumni
École Polytechnique Fédérale de Lausanne alumni
Academic staff of the École Polytechnique Fédérale de Lausanne
Writers from Geneva
Swiss sociologists